The 2008 UMass Minutemen football team represented the University of Massachusetts Amherst in the 2008 NCAA Division I FCS football season as a member of the Colonial Athletic Association.  The team was coached by Don Brown and played its home games at Warren McGuirk Alumni Stadium in Hadley, Massachusetts.  The 2008 season was Brown's last as head coach of the Minutemen.  He left the position the following season to become the defensive coordinator at Maryland.  The Minutemen finished the season with a record of 7–5 (4–4 CAA), missing the playoffs for the first time since 2005.

Schedule

References

UMass
UMass Minutemen football seasons
UMass Minutemen football